Espasol is a cylinder-shaped Filipino rice cake. Originating from the province of Laguna, it is traditionally sold during the Christmas season. It is made from rice flour cooked in coconut milk and sweetened coconut strips and, afterwards, dusted with toasted rice flour.

The term espasol is also used to describe a person's excessive make-up.

See also
Baye baye
Puto bumbong

References

Philippine desserts
Rice pudding
Philippine rice dishes
Culture of Laguna (province)
Foods containing coconut
Rice cakes